The Poplar Rural District is a nationally recognized historic district located north of Jacksonville, Iowa, United States.  It was listed on the National Register of Historic Places in 1992.  At the time of its nomination the district consisted of 55 resources, including 29 contributing buildings, one contributing site, five contributing structures, one contributing object, 15 non-contributing buildings, and four non-contributing structures.  The 36 contributing resources include three houses, 12 barns, 14 outbuildings, which are all included as buildings.  The three corn cribs and the two granaries/corn cribs are the structures. A concrete post fence line is the object, and the landscape of the district is the site.  They are all associated with the largest rural settlement of Danish immigrants in the United States.  The farmsteads are located on the hilltops or along the hillsides.  The latter appear to be somewhat linked to the ethnic heritage of the Danish immigrants who tended to locate their farmsteads on sheltered hillsides.  The period of significance starts with the construction of the original Jackson #1 schoolhouse in 1884, and concludes with the construction of the second Jackson #1 schoolhouse in 1923.

See also
Poplar, Iowa

References

Buildings and structures in Audubon County, Iowa
National Register of Historic Places in Audubon County, Iowa
Historic districts in Audubon County, Iowa
Farms on the National Register of Historic Places in Iowa
Agricultural buildings and structures on the National Register of Historic Places in Iowa
Historic districts on the National Register of Historic Places in Iowa
Danish-American culture in Iowa